The Bob Blodgett Nome–Teller Memorial Highway, also known as the Nome–Teller Highway, but generally referred to as simply the Teller Highway, is a well-maintained gravel road in the U.S. state of Alaska. It runs 72 miles northwest from Nome to the Inupiat village of Teller, located at the base of the sand spit that divides Port Clarence from Grantley Harbor.

Traversing rolling upland tundra meadows with many creek and river crossings, the road skirts the western flank of the rugged, glacier-carved Kigluaik Mountains. The road leads through some of the country's earliest gold mining areas and ends at the only Native village on the summer road system.

The road was named in honor of Robert R. "Bob" Blodgett, a Teller businessman and politician.  Nicknamed "The Heller from Teller" in the halls of the state capitol, Blodgett served as a Democratic member of the state house and senate during Alaska's early years as a state.

Junctions

References

External links

Roads in Alaska